Aron Kipchumba Koech (also known as Haron Koech; born 27 January 1990) is a Kenyan hurdler. At the 2015 Athletics Kenya World Championship Trials he finished third in the 400 metres hurdles event. Later that year he represented Kenya in the 400 metres hurdles event at the 2015 World Championships in Athletics in Beijing, China. With a personal best, in a time of 49.38, he finished 22nd in the heats. He was qualified for the semi finals where he finished 19th in a time of 49.54.  Again in 2016 he finished third at the 2016 Athletics Kenya Olympic Trials behind his brother and Boniface Mucheru Tumuti.  At the Olympics, Koech made the final while his brother was disqualified in the heats.  Tumuti went on to capture the silver medal in National Record time, while Koech finished seventh.  His 48.49 in the semi final round is his personal record.

His late twin brother, Nicholas Bett, was also a 400 metres hurdler.

International competitions

References

External links

1990 births
Living people
Kenyan male hurdlers
People from Uasin Gishu County
World Athletics Championships athletes for Kenya
Athletes (track and field) at the 2016 Summer Olympics
Olympic athletes of Kenya
Athletes (track and field) at the 2018 Commonwealth Games
Athletes (track and field) at the 2019 African Games
African Games competitors for Kenya
Commonwealth Games competitors for Kenya
21st-century Kenyan people